The Republic of Gran Colombia was a former independent country in northern South America, a post-Spanish colonial country that existed from 1819 to 1831. Its initial subdivisions, created in 1820, were revised and expanded in 1824.

1820 Departments 

The initial country subdivision of Gran Colombia was into three departments, without larger districts or smaller provinces. They were:
 Cundinamarca Department
 Quito Department 
 Venezuela Department

1824 Districts, departments, & provinces

Distrito del Norte
The Distrito del Norte (northern district) was in present-day Venezuela and Brazil.  Its departments and provinces were:
 Apure Department: 2 provinces — Barinas Province and Achaguas Province.
 Orinoco Department: 4 provinces — Cumaná Province, Barcelona Province, Guayana Province and Margarita Province.
 Venezuela Department: 2 provinces — Caracas Province and Carabobo Province.
 Zulia Department: 4 provinces — Maracaybo/Maracaibo, Coro Province, Mérida Province and Trujillo Province.

Distrito del Centro
The Distrito del Centro (central district) was in present-day Colombia and Panamá. Its departments and provinces were:
 Boyacá Department: 4 provinces — Tunja Province, Casanare Province, Pamplona Province, and Socorro Province.
 Cauca Department: 4 provinces — Popayán Province, Buenaventura Province, Chocó Province, Pasto Province.
 Cundinamarca Department: 4 provinces — Bogotá Province, Antioquia Province, Mariquita Province, Neiva Province.
 Istmo Department: 2 provinces — Istmo Province and Veraguas Province.
 Magdalena Department: 3 provinces — Cartagena Province, Riohacha Province, Santa Marta Province.

Distrito del Sur
The Distrito del Sur (southern district) was in present-day Ecuador, and north of Marañón River in present-day Perú. Its departments and provinces were:
 Azuay Department:  3 provinces — Cuenca Province, Loja Province, Jaén de Bracamoros y Maynas Province.
 Guayaquil Department: 2 provinces — Guayaquil Province and Manabi Province.
 Ecuador Department: 3 provinces — Pichincha Province, Chimborazo Province and Imbabura Province.

Maps of subdivisions

See also
Provinces of Gran Colombia
Departments of Colombia — in present day country.

External links
 Ley de División Territorial de la República de Colombia—
 Historia territorial de Colombia—